Bayguzino (Bayğuja) is a rural locality (a village) and the administrative centre of Bayguzinsky Selsoviet, Yanaulsky District, Bashkortostan, Russia. The population was 487 as of 2010. There are 6 streets.

Geography 
Bayguzino is located 16 km southwest of Yanaul (the district's administrative centre) by road. Urakayevo is the nearest rural locality.

References 

Rural localities in Yanaulsky District